Sveta Nedelya Cathedral Church, is an Eastern Orthodox cathedral in Sofia, the capital of Bulgaria, a cathedral of the Sofia bishopric of the Bulgarian Patriarchate. The temple of Sveta Nedelya dates back to the 10th century, being a cathedral of the city from the 18th century. The sacred building has suffered destruction through the ages and has been reconstructed many times. The present building of the temple is among the landmarks of Sofia. It was designed by the famous Bulgarian architectural team Vasilyov-Tsolov. The relics of the Serbian king Stefan Uroš II Milutin are kept in the church.

History
The history of the cathedral's earliest years is to a large extent unknown. It was probably built in the 10th century and had stone foundations and an otherwise wooden construction, remaining wooden until the middle of the 19th century, unlike most other churches in the city. A German traveller by the name of Stephan Gerlach visited Sofia in 1578 and mentioned the church.

Around 1460, the remains of Serbian king Stefan Uroš II Milutin were carried to Bulgaria and were stored in various churches and monasteries until being transferred to St Nedelya after it became a bishop's residence in the 18th century. With some interruptions, the remains have been preserved in the church ever since and the church acquired another name, Holy King („Свети Крал“, „Sveti Kral“), in the late 19th and early 20th century.

The former building was demolished to make place for a larger and more imposing cathedral on 25 April 1856. The construction of the 35.5 m-long and 19 m-wide church began in the summer of the same year. The still incomplete building suffered from an earthquake in 1858, which prolonged the construction works that ultimately finished in 1863. It was officially inaugurated on 11 May 1867 in the presence of 20,000 people. A new belfry was erected to accommodate the 8 bells given to the church as a present by Russian Knyaz (Prince) Alexander Mikhailovich Dondukov-Korsakov in 1879.

The church was renovated in 1898, with new domes being added. Exarch Joseph I of Bulgaria was buried immediately outside the walls of St Nedelya in 1915. The church was razed in the assault in 1925 that claimed over 150 victims. After the assault, the church was restored to its modern appearance between the summer of 1927 and the spring of 1933 (once again inaugurated on 7 April 1933). It was almost erected anew as a temple 30 m in length and 15.50 m in width and featuring a central dome that made it 31 m high. The gilt iconostasis that survived the bomb attack was returned to the church.

The mural decoration was done by a team led by Nikolay Rostovtsev between 1971 and 1973. The floor was renovated and the north colonnade was glazed between 1992 and 1994. The façade was cleaned thoroughly in 2000 and a device to automatically ring the eleven bells (the eight ones from Knyaz Dondukov-Korsakov, two made in Serbia and one cast in Bulgaria)

Name
The origin of the name Sveta Nedelya is rather obscure. It can be translated as either "Holy Sunday", "Saint Nedelya", or even as "Saint Sunday", depending on which etymology is taken as the basis. According  to the Bulgarian Orthodox website pravoslavieto.com, the church was noted by a German traveller, Stephan Gerlach, in 1578, as being known by several names, among which "The Lord's Church" (Bulgarian: Gospodnya Tsurkva) and "Jesus Christ Church" (Tsurkva Isus Hristos) but, more importantly, by the Greek name Kyriaki, a word literally meaning "Sunday", but which itself derives from Kyrios – "Lord" (i.e. Sunday, or Kyriaki = "The Lord's Day" and hence "The Lord's Church"). Furthermore, Kyriaki is also the name of a third-century Christian martyr – Saint Kyriaki, known in Bulgarian as Sveta Nedelya (Nedelya = "Sunday"). So, even though today the meaning appears to refer to the holiness of the day of Sunday, it may have originally referred to the young martyr Saint Kyriaki, or ultimately to Jesus Christ.

Gallery

See also
List of churches in Sofia

References
 Tsarkoven vestnik. The St Nedelya Sofia cathedral by Dr Hristo Temelski. Visited 18 April 2006.

External links
 Old photographs of the cathedral

10th-century churches
Nedelya Church, Saint
Nedelya Church, Saint
Bulgarian Orthodox churches in Sofia
Churches completed in 1867
Churches completed in 1933
Cathedrals in Sofia
Church buildings with domes